"Stockholm i natt" is a song written by Andreas Mattsson, Niclas Frisk and Peter Jöback, and performed by Peter Jöback on his 2007 studio album Människor som du och jag. The single was released the same year and peaked at number four on the Swedish Singles Chart. Lyrically, the song deals with crimes throughout the history of Stockholm.

The song stayed at Svensktoppen for 22 weeks between 26 August 2007-20 January 2008, peaking at second position.

Charts

References

2007 singles
Swedish songs
Songs about Stockholm
Swedish-language songs
2007 songs
Songs written by Peter Jöback
Songs written by Niclas Frisk